A temper is a non-plastic material added to clay to prevent shrinkage and cracking during drying and firing of vessels made from the clay. Tempers may include:

Bone;
Chaff;
Charcoal;
Ground schist;
Wood ash;
Grit;
Sand or crushed sandstone;
Crushed limestone;
Crushed igneous rocks, such as volcanic rock, feldspar, or mica;
Grog;
Plant fiber;
Horse manure (dried and sifted);
Crushed mollusc shells (including fossilized) (see Shell tempering in the Mississippian culture); and
Freshwater sponge spicules.

Some clays used to make pottery do not require the addition of tempers. Pure kaolin clay does not require tempering. Some clays are self-tempered, that is, naturally contain enough mica, sand, or sponge spicules that they do not require additional tempering.

See also
Ceramic#Archaeology

Citations

References

External links
 Common Inclusions and/or Tempers - Images (including micrographs) of shards with various tempers.

Ceramic materials